Stomopteryx mongolica is a moth of the family Gelechiidae. It was described by Povolný in 1975. It is found in Mongolia and the eastern part of European Russia.

The length of the forewings is 6–10 mm.

References

Moths described in 1975
Stomopteryx